Arjuyeh (also Romanized as Ārjūyeh; also known as Argū and Ārgū) is a village in Pol Beh Bala Rural District, Simakan District, Jahrom County, Fars Province, Iran. At the 2006 census, its population was 1,585, in 323 families.

References 

Populated places in Jahrom County